Shadow of Egypt is a 1924 British silent adventure film directed by Sidney Morgan and starring Carlyle Blackwell, Alma Taylor and Milton Rosmer. A European adventurer tries to steal from an ancient Egyptian tomb, only to become afflicted by a mysterious curse.

The film was shot on location around Cairo in Egypt.

The Shadow of Egypt is based on Norma Lorimer's 1923 novel of the same name.

Cast
 Carlyle Blackwell as Sheik Hanan 
 Alma Taylor as Lilian Westcott 
 Milton Rosmer as Harold Westcott 
 Joan Morgan as Princess Moonface 
 Arthur Walcott as Abdallah 
 Charles Levey as Yusef 
 John F. Hamilton as Apollo

References

1924 films
1924 adventure films
British adventure films
British silent feature films
Films directed by Sidney Morgan
Films based on British novels
Films set in Egypt
British black-and-white films
1920s British films
Silent adventure films